Baqerabad (also Romanized as Bāqerābād) is a village in Shirang Rural District, Kamalan District, Aliabad County, Golestan Province, Iran. At the 2006 census, its population was 808, in 187 families.

References 

Populated places in Aliabad County